During 1965, The Beatles toured Europe.

Set list
The typical set list for the shows was as follows (with lead singers noted):

"Twist and Shout" (short version) (John Lennon)
"She's a Woman" (Paul McCartney)
"I'm a Loser" (John Lennon)
"Can't Buy Me Love" (Paul McCartney)
"Baby's in Black" (John Lennon and Paul McCartney)
"I Wanna Be Your Man" (Ringo Starr)
"A Hard Day's Night" (John Lennon and Paul McCartney)
"Everybody's Trying to Be My Baby" (George Harrison)
"Rock and Roll Music" (John Lennon)
"I Feel Fine" (John Lennon)
"Ticket to Ride" (John Lennon)
"Long Tall Sally" (Paul McCartney)

Tour dates

Instruments and equipment
Instruments The Beatles had on the tour, shown here for each member of the group.

John
1964 Rickenbacker 325 hollowbody electric guitar
1964 Gibson J-160E acoustic/electric guitar (used for "I Feel Fine" and as a backup)
Hohner Marine Band harmonica in key of G with harness (used for "I'm A Loser")

Paul
1965 Hofner Violin hollowbody bass
1962 Hofner Violin hollowbody bass (used as a backup)

George
1963 Gretsch Tennessean hollowbody electric guitar
1963 Rickenbacker 360-12 thinline electric guitar (used exclusively for "A Hard Day's Night")
1963 Gretsch Country Gentleman hollowbody electric guitar (used as a backup)

Ringo
Ludwig 22-inch-bass 4-piece drum kit
Number #4 drop-T logo bass drum head

See also
 List of the Beatles' live performances

External links
Live at Milan

References

1965 concert tours
1965 European
Concert tours of Europe
June 1965 events in Europe
July 1965 events in Europe